Aeromak was a planned airline based in Skopje, Republic of North Macedonia.

History
Aeromak was founded in 2009 by Jat Airways now Air Serbia to replace the now-defunct airline, MAT Macedonian Airlines.
The name Aeromak (Air Transport) - with the code AMK -  existed already in Macedonia/Skopje since the early 1990s.

The CEO hired by Jat Airways for Aeromak, was sacked in December 2009 after problems regarding the airline's funds.

Fleet
Aeromak is yet to announce the fleet.

References

Defunct airlines of North Macedonia
Airlines established in 2009
Airlines disestablished in 2009
Companies based in Skopje
Macedonian companies established in 2009